Bikram Keshari Barma (25 May 1940 – 5 June 2021) was an Indian politician who served as a Member of the Odisha Legislative Assembly for Mahanga from 2004 to 2009.

Biography
He was a Member of the Odisha Legislative Assembly for Mahanga from 2004 until 2009.

Barma died from COVID-19 at age 81 in Bhubaneswar on 5 June 2021, during the COVID-19 pandemic in Odisha.

References

1940 births
2021 deaths
Biju Janata Dal politicians
Members of the Odisha Legislative Assembly
Deaths from the COVID-19 pandemic in India
21st-century Indian politicians
Odisha MLAs 2004–2009
People from Cuttack district